William Enrique Lucena Amato (born October 1, 1981) is a former Venezuelan-born Italian baseball right-handed pitcher who competed in the 2004 Summer Olympics. He was born in Maracaibo, Zulia.

In between, Lucena pitched for the Comcor Modena and T & A San Marino clubs of the Italian Baseball League in a span of nine seasons from 2000–2008.

Besides, he also pitched for the Italian national team in the 2002 Intercontinental Cup, 2003 Baseball World Cup, 2003 European Baseball Championship, and 2008 European Cup.

Sources

1981 births
Living people
Baseball pitchers
Baseball players at the 2004 Summer Olympics
Italian people of Venezuelan descent
Olympic baseball players of Italy
Modena Baseball Club players
Sportspeople from Maracaibo
T & A San Marino players
Expatriate baseball players in San Marino